Heavy Metal Anthem is Japanese heavy metal band Anthem's return album, released nearly 8 years since their disbandment in the early 1990s, it's the eighth studio album. Most of the former members play on the album, but the original vocalist, Eizo Sakamoto, did not return until the next album (Seven Hills).
The album was released on April 21, 2000 and was a joint collaboration between the band and singer Graham Bonnet. Most of the songs are Anthem's older releases, which have been remixed and sung in English by Bonnet.

Track listing 
 "Gypsy Ways (Win,Lose or Draw)" (Boyd, Shibata) - 5:47
 "Evil Touch" (Boyd, Shibata) - 4:47
 "Show Must Go On!" (Sakamoto, Shibata, Tsangarides) - 3:52
 "Midnight Sun" (Boyd, Shibata, Tsangarides) - 4:44
 "The Juggler" (Boyd, Shibata) - 3:49
 "Mr. Genius" (Boyd, Shibata) - 4:32
 "Cryin' Heart" (Boyd, Shibata) - 4:47
 "Hunting Time" (Boyd, Shibata) - 6:02
 "Hungry Soul" (Boyd, Shibata) - 5:23
 "Blinded Pain" (Boyd, Shibata) - 7:15

Personnel

Band members
Graham Bonnet - vocals
Naoto Shibata - bass, producer
Takamasa "mad" Ohuchi - drums
Akio Shimizu - guitars

Additional musicians
Kazumasa Saitoh - guitar on "Gipsy Ways"
Hirotsugu Homma - drums on "Hungry Soul"
Yoshitaka Mikuni - keyboards

Production
Yorimasa Hisatake - producer
Chris Tsangarides - producer, mixing
Masahiro Fukuhara - engineer
Yasuo Higashidate - engineer
Katsuyuki Kobayashi - assistant engineer
Nobuyoshi Tanaka - assistant engineer
Tim Luce - vocal engineer
Kevin Valentine - vocal engineer
George Azuma - supervisor

References

2000 albums
Anthem (band) albums
Albums produced by Chris Tsangarides
Victor Entertainment albums